Abdul Matin (December 3, 1926 – October 8, 2014) was a language activist of the Bengali Language Movement that took place in the erstwhile East Pakistan (currently Bangladesh) to make Bengali one of the state language of Pakistan. He was one of the student leaders and organizers of the movement. His contribution to the movement has been hailed by the other activists and students as he was popularly known as Bhasha Matin.

Early life
Matin was admitted to Darjeeling School in 1932. After passing the matriculation in 1943 he came back to East Bengal. Later that year he was admitted to Rajshahi College. According to him he had no political consensus before getting into the college. He was graduated in 1947.

Involvement in Language Movement
Matin was active during the language movement. When the government decided not to include Bengali as one of the official languages, students protested on March 11, 1948, where Matin joined for picketing. On 24 March 1948, after Mohammad Ali Jinnah made his speech at Race Course Maidan (currently Suhrawardy Udyan), he came to the University of Dhaka for convocation. Matin was also present at the ceremony to receive his degree. When Jinnah repeated his position about language policy, however, Matin stood up at the chair and shouted, No. It can not be. Other students also supported him during that time.
In mid-September 1951, in a meeting at the central building of Dhaka University, Matin said that they have no complaints about Urdu, but he wanted Bangla's status with Urdu.
Matin was present at the meeting on 30 January 1952, and became a member of the Shorbodolio Rashtrabhasha Kormoporishod. Earlier, on 11 March 1951, a rally was held at Dhaka University, organised by the then East Pakistan Chatra (Student League). Khaleque Nawaz Khan, veteran student leader and  the president of the then Chatra League, presided over that meeting. In that meeting, Matin was selected as convener of the Dhaka University Language Action Committee.

Other political involvements
Matin joined with the 4th class clerks at one of their procession. There he was arrested and spend two months in prison. Coming back from jail, the Vice Chancellor of the university asked him for a bond. After his refusal, however, he was sacked for three years, which, according to him, was the turning point of his political career. He played an active role to form Chhatra Union in April 1952 and became the second president of its East Pakistan unit. Matin was appointed secretary of Communist Party's Pabna district unit in 1954. Three years later, he joined Maulana Bhasani's NAP.

He formed East Pakistan Communist Party (ML) in 1958 and followed the ideology of Charu Majumdar, a communist revolutionary of India.

After liberation, he fought against Jatiya Rakkhi Bahini and was arrested in 1972.

Death
Matin died on 8 October 2014, at Dhaka's Bangabandhu Sheikh Mujib Medical University (BSMMU). He was undergoing treatment at the ICU after a stroke on 18 August and was on life support after his condition deteriorated on 3 October.

Awards
Matin was awarded Ekushey Padak in 2001. In 2008, University of Dhaka conferred honorary Doctor of Law degree on him for his contribution to the language movement.

References

1926 births
2014 deaths
Rajshahi College alumni
Bengali language movement activists
Recipients of the Independence Day Award
Recipients of the Ekushey Padak